The Coachman (마부 - Mabu) is a 1961 South Korean film directed by Kang Dae-jin. At the 11th Berlin International Film Festival in 1961, The Coachman became the first Korean film to win a major international award. It was nominated for the Golden Bear Award and won the Silver Bear Extraordinary Jury Prize.

Synopsis
A single father living with his adult children makes a living with a horse-drawn cart. He finds companionship with his boss's maid. His eldest daughter is a deaf-mute married to an abusive man, his youngest seeks to meet a man of means and his youngest son is rebellious. His oldest son wants to help relieve the families financial problems by passing the bar exam.

References

Bibliography

1961 films
1960s Korean-language films
South Korean drama films